Brookula pfefferi is a species of sea snail, a marine gastropod mollusk unassigned in the superfamily Seguenzioidea.

Description
The shell grows to a height of 2.5 mm.

Distribution
This marine species occurs off the South Georgia Islands.

References

 Zelaya D.G., Absalão R.S. & Pimenta A.D. 2006. A revision of Benthobrookula Clarker, 1961 (Gastropoda, Trochoidea) in the Southwestern Atlantic Ocean. Journal of Molluscan Studies, 72(1): 77–87
 Engl W. (2012) Shells of Antarctica. Hackenheim: Conchbooks. 402 pp.

pfefferi
Gastropods described in 1951